Before I Change My Mind is a Canadian coming-of-age drama film, directed by Trevor Anderson and released in 2022. Set in 1987, the film stars Vaughan Murrae as Robin, a non-binary person whose family moves to a small town in Alberta, where they navigate the challenges of fitting into a new environment by befriending Carter (Dominic Lippa), the school bully.

Its cast also includes Lacey Oake, Matthew Rankin, Shannon Blanchet, Rohan Khare, Jhztyn Contado, Milana Bochinska, Kaitlyn Haugen, Kristin Johnston, Etta George House, Andrea House, Heather Noel, Ethan Nasr, Joshua Carter, Onika Henry and Desiree Burkett, as well as Anderson himself in a small supporting role as a music teacher.

The film premiered on August 10, 2022 at the 75th Locarno Film Festival, and had its Canadian premiere at the 2022 FIN Atlantic Film Festival in September.

Production
The film, Anderson's feature debut following a number of short films, was supported in advance of production by both the Inside Out Film and Video Festival's Financing Forum and GLAAD's 2020 list of LGBTQ-centred screenplays in development. It was shot in and around Red Deer, Alberta, in 2021.

Critical response
IndieWire highlighted the film as one of ten must-see films at Locarno, writing that it was "convincingly draped in a soft and transportive ‘80s aesthetic" and that it "seems determined to confront the challenges and triumphs of self-becoming with the unwavering honesty of someone who remembers them both".

For Screen Anarchy, Martin Kudlac wrote that the film effectively subverted and refreshed many of the tropes and clichés of the teen coming-of-age genre.

Awards
At the Calgary International Film Festival, the film was named as one of the ten advance finalists for the festival's RBC Emerging Canadian Artist competition.

The film was longlisted for the Directors Guild of Canada's 2022 Jean-Marc Vallée DGC Discovery Award.

Lacey Oake won the award for Best Performance in a Female Role at the 2022 Iris Prize.

References

External links

2022 films
2022 drama films
2022 LGBT-related films
Canadian coming-of-age drama films
Canadian LGBT-related films
Films shot in Alberta
Films set in Alberta
Films directed by Trevor Anderson
LGBT-related coming-of-age films
English-language Canadian films
2020s Canadian films
2022 directorial debut films